Keerti Vandravan Shah (November 2, 1928 – July 21, 2019) was an Indian virologist known for his research confirming that the human papillomavirus causes cervical cancer. This research led to the development of the HPV vaccine. From 1962 until his retirement in 2013, he was on the faculty of the Bloomberg School of Public Health at Johns Hopkins University. In 2006, the Department of Molecular Microbiology and Immunology in the Bloomberg School of Public Health honored Shah by proclaiming October 7 to be Keerti Shah Day.

References

External links

1928 births
2019 deaths
Indian emigrants to the United States
Deaths from kidney failure
Indian virologists
Johns Hopkins Bloomberg School of Public Health faculty
Johns Hopkins University alumni
People from Botad district